USS Affray (AMc-112) was an  acquired by the U.S. Navy for the dangerous task of removing mines from minefields laid in the water to prevent ships from passing.

Affray – a wooden-hulled, coastal minesweeper built in 1941 at Tacoma, Washington, by the Tacoma Boatbuilding Company was acquired by the Navy late in 1941 and was placed in service on 2 December 1941.

World War II service 

Though she may have performed some duty at Seattle, Washington, initially Affray spent the bulk of her active career at Kodiak, Alaska. Her war diary does not begin until 1 July 1942, and, by that time, the warship was already at Kodiak conducting sweeps for mines and making other patrols on a daily basis. She remained so occupied throughout World War II.

Post-war deactivation 

Affray returned to Seattle in mid-October 1945 and began preparations for inactivation. She was placed out of service on 10 December 1945 and her name was struck from the Navy list on 3 January 1946. On 23 March 1946, she was sold back to her former owners.

References

External links 
 Dictionary of American Naval Fighting Ships
 NavSource Online: Mine Warfare Vessel Photo Archive – Affray (AMc 112)

Ships built by Tacoma Boatbuilding Company
1941 ships
World War II minesweepers of the United States
Accentor-class minesweepers